The Dutch Eerste Divisie in the 1988–89 season was contested by 19 teams. Vitesse Arnhem won the championship.

New entrants
Relegated from the 1987–88 Eredivisie
 AZ
 DS '79
 FC Den Haag

League standings

Promotion competition
In the promotion competition, four period winners (the best teams during each of the four quarters of the regular competition) played for promotion to the eredivisie.

See also
 1988–89 Eredivisie
 1988–89 KNVB Cup

References
Netherlands - List of final tables (RSSSF)

Eerste Divisie seasons
2
Neth